Frances Kathleen Oldham Kelsey  ( Oldham; July 24, 1914 – August 7, 2015) was a Canadian-American pharmacologist and physician. As a reviewer for the U.S. Food and Drug Administration (FDA), she refused to authorize thalidomide for market because she had concerns about the lack of evidence regarding the drug's safety. Her concerns proved to be justified when it was shown that thalidomide caused serious birth defects. Kelsey's career intersected with the passage of laws strengthening FDA oversight of pharmaceuticals. Kelsey was the second woman to receive the President's Award for Distinguished Federal Civilian Service, awarded to her by John F. Kennedy in 1962.

Birth and education 
Born in Cobble Hill, British Columbia, Kelsey attended St. Margaret's School from 1928–1931 in the provincial capital, graduating at age 15. From 1930–1931, she attended Victoria College (now University of Victoria). She then enrolled at McGill University, where she received both a B.Sc. (1934) and an M.Sc. (1935) in pharmacology. Encouraged by one of her professors, she "wrote to EMK Geiling, M.D., a noted researcher [who] was starting up a new pharmacology department at the University of Chicago, asking for a position doing graduate work". Geiling, unaware of spelling conventions with respect to Francis and Frances, presumed that Frances was a man and offered her the position, which she accepted, starting work in 1936.

During Kelsey's second year, Geiling was retained by the FDA to research unusual deaths related to elixir sulfanilamide, a sulfonamide medicine. Kelsey assisted on this research project, which showed that the 107 deaths were caused by the use of diethylene glycol as a solvent. The next year, the United States Congress passed the Federal Food, Drug, and Cosmetic Act of 1938. That same year she completed her studies and received a Ph.D. in pharmacology at the University of Chicago. Working with Geiling led to her interest in teratogens, drugs that cause congenital malformations (birth defects).

Early career  

Upon completing her Ph.D., Oldham joined the University of Chicago faculty. In 1942, like many other pharmacologists, Oldham was looking for a synthetic cure for malaria. As a result of these studies, Oldham learned that some drugs are able to pass through the placental barrier. During her work, she also met fellow faculty member Fremont Ellis Kelsey, whom she married in 1943.

While on the faculty at the University of Chicago, Kelsey was awarded her M.D. in 1950. She supplemented her teaching with work as an editorial associate for the American Medical Association Journal for two years. Kelsey left the University of Chicago in 1954, decided to take a position teaching pharmacology at the University of South Dakota, and moved with her husband and two daughters to Vermillion, South Dakota, where she taught until 1957.

She became a dual citizen of Canada and the United States in the 1950s in order to continue practicing medicine in the U.S., but retained strong ties to Canada where she continued to visit her siblings regularly until late in life.

Work at the FDA and thalidomide 

In 1960, Kelsey was hired by the FDA in Washington, D.C. At that time, she "was one of only seven full-time and four young part-time physicians reviewing drugs" for the FDA. One of her first assignments at the FDA was to review an application by Richardson-Merrell for the drug thalidomide (under the tradename Kevadon) as a tranquilizer and painkiller with specific indications to prescribe the drug to pregnant women for morning sickness. Although it had been previously approved in Canada and more than 20 European and African countries, she withheld approval for the drug and requested further studies. Despite pressure from thalidomide's manufacturer Grünenthal, Kelsey persisted in requesting additional information to explain an English study that documented peripheral neuritis, a nervous system side effect. She also requested data showing the drug was not harmful to the fetus.

Kelsey's insistence that the drug should be fully tested prior to approval was vindicated when the births of deformed infants in Europe were linked to thalidomide ingestion by their mothers during pregnancy. Researchers discovered that the thalidomide crossed the placental barrier and caused serious birth defects. She was hailed on the front page of The Washington Post as a heroine for averting a similar tragedy in the U.S. Morton Mintz, author of The Washington Post article, said  prevented ... the birth of hundreds or indeed thousands of armless and legless children." Kelsey insisted that her assistants, Oyama Jiro and Lee Geismar, as well as her FDA superiors who backed her strong stance, deserved credit as well. The narrative of Kelsey's persistence was used to help pass rigorous drug approval regulation in 1962.

After Morton Mintz broke the story in July 1962, there was a substantial public outcry. The Kefauver Harris Amendment was passed unanimously by Congress in October 1962 to strengthen drug regulation. Companies were required to demonstrate the efficacy of new drugs, report adverse reactions to the FDA, and request consent from patients participating in clinical studies. The drug testing reforms required "stricter limits on the testing and distribution of new drugs" to avoid similar problems. The amendments, for the first time, also recognized that "effectiveness [should be] required to be established prior to marketing."

As a result of her blocking American approval of thalidomide, Kelsey was awarded the President's Award for Distinguished Federal Civilian Service by John F. Kennedy on August 7, 1962, becoming the second woman so honoured. After receiving the award, Kelsey continued her work at the FDA. There she played a key role in shaping and enforcing the 1962 amendments. She also became responsible for directing the surveillance of drug testing at the FDA.

Kelsey retired from the FDA in 2005, at age 90, after 45 years of service.

Later life and death 

Kelsey continued to work for the FDA while being recognised for her earlier work. She was still working at the FDA's Center for Drug Evaluation and Research in 1995 and was appointed deputy for scientific and medical affairs. In 1994, the Frances Kelsey Secondary School in Mill Bay, British Columbia, was named in her honour. 

In 2010, the FDA presented Kelsey with the first Drug Safety Excellence Award and named the annual award after her, announcing that it would be given to one FDA staff member annually. In announcing the awards, Center Director Steven K. Galson said "I am very pleased to have established the Dr. Frances O. Kelsey Drug Safety Excellence Award and to recognize the first recipients for their outstanding accomplishments in this important aspect of drug regulation."

Kelsey turned 100 in July 2014, and shortly thereafter, in the fall of 2014, she moved from Washington, D.C., to live with her daughter in London, Ontario. In June 2015, when she was named to the Order of Canada, Mercédes Benegbi, a thalidomide victim and the head of the Thalidomide Victims Association of Canada, praised Kelsey for showing strength and courage by refusing to bend to pressure from drug company officials, and said "To us, she was always our heroine, even if what she did was in another country."

Kelsey died in London, Ontario, on August 7, 2015, at the age of 101, less than 24 hours after Ontario's Lieutenant-Governor, Elizabeth Dowdeswell, visited her home to present her with the insignia of Member of the Order of Canada for her role against thalidomide.

Legacy and awards 

 1962 • President's Award for Distinguished Federal Civilian Service
 1963 • Gold Key Award from University of Chicago, Medical and Biological Sciences Alumni Association
 1994 • Chosen as the namesake for Frances Kelsey Secondary School which opened in 1995.
 2000 • Inducted into the National Women's Hall of Fame
 2001 • Named a Virtual Mentor for the American Medical Association
 2006 • Foremother Award from the National Center for Health Research
 2010 • Recipient of the first Dr. Frances O. Kelsey Award for Excellence and Courage in Protecting Public Health given out by the FDA
 2012 • Honorary doctor of science degree from Vancouver Island University
 2015 • Named to the Order of Canada

See also 
 European Medicines Agency

References

Further reading 

 
 .
 .
 . This was drawn from oral history interviews conducted in 1974, 1991, and 1992; presentation, Founder's Day, St. Margaret's School, Duncan, B. C., 1987; and presentation, groundbreaking, Frances Kelsey School, Mill Bay, B. C., 1993.
 .
 . Library of Congress catalog entry.
 .
 .
 .
 .
 .

1914 births
2015 deaths
American civil servants
American centenarians
American pharmacologists
Canadian centenarians
Canadian emigrants to the United States
Canadian pharmacologists
Women pharmacologists
20th-century Canadian physicians
20th-century American physicians
Canadian women physicians
Food and Drug Administration people
McGill University Faculty of Science alumni
Members of the Order of Canada
People from the Cowichan Valley Regional District
University of Chicago alumni
University of Chicago faculty
University of South Dakota faculty
Victoria College, British Columbia alumni
20th-century American women physicians
Women centenarians
Members of the Society of Woman Geographers
Recipients of the President's Award for Distinguished Federal Civilian Service
American women academics
20th-century Canadian women scientists
21st-century American women